Banks is a city in Washington County, Oregon, United States which is located in the Tualatin Valley. The population was 1,777 at the 2010 census. The community was named for John and Nancy Banks, who owned a nearby dairy farm. Incorporated in 1921, it is located in the western part of the county where Oregon Route 6 intersects Oregon Route 47.

Geography

Demographics

2010 census
As of the census of 2010, there were 1,777 people, 553 households, and 445 families living in the city. The racial makeup of the city was 92.5% White, 0.3% African American, 0.6% Native American, 1.2% Asian, 0.3% Pacific Islander, 1.4% from other races, and 3.8% from two or more races. Hispanic or Latino of any race were 7.0% of the population.

There were 553 households, of which 57.1% had children under the age of 18 living with them, 59.5% were married couples living together, 13.4% had a female householder with no husband present, 7.6% had a male householder with no wife present, and 19.5% were non-families. 14.3% of all households were made up of individuals, and 2.5% had someone living alone who was 65 years of age or older. The average household size was 3.21 and the average family size was 3.54.

The median age in the city was 29.5 years. 37.8% of residents were under the age of 18; 7.4% were between the ages of 18 and 24; 31.7% were from 25 to 44; 19.2% were from 45 to 64; and 3.9% were 65 years of age or older. The gender makeup of the city was 50.6% male and 49.4% female.

2000 census
As of the census of 2000, there were 1,286 people, 440 households, and 337 families living in the city. The population density was 3,885.7 people per square mile (1,504.6/km2). There were 492 housing units at an average density of 1,486.6 per square mile (575.6/km2). The racial makeup of the city was 91.14% White, 0.39% African American, 0.31% Native American, 1.79% Asian, 0.47% Pacific Islander, 2.80% from other races, and 3.11% from two or more races. Hispanic or Latino of any race were 3.81% of the population.

There were 440 households, out of which 50.7% had children under the age of 18 living with them, 64.1% were married couples living together, 8.6% had a female householder with no husband present, and 23.4% were non-families. 17.7% of all households were made up of individuals, and 3.2% had someone living alone who was 65 years of age or older. The average household size was 2.92 and the average family size was 3.31.

In the city, the population was spread out, with 35.8% under the age of 18, 7.8% from 18 to 24, 39.9% from 25 to 44, 12.5% from 45 to 64, and 4.0% who were 65 years of age or older. The median age was 29 years. For every 100 females, there were 97.5 males. For every 100 females age 18 and over, there were 93.4 males.

The median income for a household in the city was $57,500, and the median income for a family was $61,932. Males had a median income of $42,330 versus $26,818 for females. The per capita income for the city was $21,354. About 3.1% of families and 3.2% of the population were below the poverty line, including 2.1% of those under age 18 and 4.6% of those age 65 or over.

Schools 
The city has three public schools, which are administered by the Banks School District. The city schools are Banks Elementary School, Banks Junior High School, and Banks High School.

Attractions 

 Banks-Vernonia State Trail

See also
Banks Public Library
Sunset Speedway

References

External links

 Entry for Banks in the Oregon Blue Book

 
Cities in Oregon
Cities in Washington County, Oregon
Portland metropolitan area
1921 establishments in Oregon